North Korean Russian or Russian North Korean may refer to:
North Koreans in Russia
Russians in North Korea
North Korea – Russia relations
Mixed race people of North Korean and Russian descent